Cerna may refer to:

Populated places
 Cerna, Croatia, Vukovar-Syrmia County, Croatia
 Černá (Žďár nad Sázavou District), Czech Republic
 Černá, Semily District, Czech Republic
 Cerna, Tulcea, Romania
 A village in Vaideeni Commune, Vâlcea County, Romania

Rivers

Romania
 Cerna (Mureș), a tributary of the Mureș in Hunedoara County
 Cerna (Danube), a tributary of the Danube in southwestern Romania
 Cerna (Olteț), a tributary of the Olteț in Vâlcea County
 Cerna (Tulcea), a small tributary of the Danube in Tulcea County
 Cerna (Crasna), a tributary of the Crasna in Maramureș and Satu Mare Counties
 A tributary of the Mag river in Sibiu County

Other rivers
 Černá (river), a river in the Czech Republic and Germany

People
 Cerna (surname)
 Černá (surname)

Other
 ceRNA, competing endogenous RNA, a function of microRNA
 Cerna (political organization), part of Anova-Nationalist Brotherhood

See also
 Černá (disambiguation)
 Černá Hora (disambiguation)
 
 Crna (disambiguation)
 Cerny (disambiguation)
 Cernay (disambiguation)
 Cerney (disambiguation)
 Cernat (disambiguation)